Stay True is the debut album by Deez Nuts. It was released on October 4, 2008, by Stomp Entertainment. All of the album's instruments and lead vocals were done by JJ Peters. Guest vocals performed by Jamie Hope of ex-The Red Shore, Joel Birch and Ahren Stringer of The Amity Affliction, and Louie Knuxx.

Track listing

Credits 
JJ Peters - vocals, guitar, bass, drums
Joel Birch - backing vocals
Jamie Hope - backing vocals
Ahren Stringer - backing vocals
Todd "Louie Knuxx" Williams - backing vocals

Charts

References

2008 albums
Deez Nuts (band) albums